The International Vale Tudo Championship (IVC) was a Vale Tudo and mixed martial arts (MMA) fighting promotion based in Brazil starting in 1997. The IVC was a fundamentally important platform in the promotion of Brazilian MMA in the late 1990s and early 2000s.

History

The IVC was established in 1997 by Sérgio Batarelli after a disagreement between him Frederico Lapenda, with whom he had been co-promoter of the World Vale Tudo Championship (WVC). Batarelli was a former kickboxing world champion and had Vale Tudo experience with a bout against Casimiro "Rei Zulu" de Nascimento Martins in 1984 and he decided to become involved in the business side of the nascent sport. He helped arrange UFC Brazil in 1998 and would become manager of multiple Brazilian MMA and K-1 fighters. The IVC revealed many future stars of MMA such as Wanderlei Silva, José "Pelé" Landi-Jons, Renato Sobral, Johil de Oliveira, Artur Mariano, Ebenezer Fontes Braga, Branden Lee Hinkle, Carlos Barreto, Wallid Ismail, among others, and counted with recognized foreign fighters as well such as Chuck Liddell and Gary Goodridge.

The first events were no holds barred contests inspired by the Ultimate Fighting Championship and gained an international reputation for its hardcore nature. It became one of the most important Vale Tudo tournaments in Brazil during its existence, and in the world just after the UFC and PRIDE Fighting Championships. While the UFC fights were held in an octagon, the IVC kept the normal ring shape but the lower ropes had a net to prevent fighters to fall off. A fight lasted a maximum of 30 minutes. It was not uncommon for fighters to get a hand broken, lose teeth, or receive cuts in their faces. Head butts and groin strikes were not forbidden. Head butts render fighters on the bottom in the guard position more vulnerable. In a memorable fight in the first edition, Gary Goodridge stuck his feet inside Pedro Otávio's trunks and proceeded to crush his testicles, after they stood up, Goodridge kept trying to put his hands inside Pedro's trunks and keep smashing his testicles. Putting hands or feet inside the opponents shorts became illegal by the second event. An IVC in 1999 concluded with 8 out of 10 matches finished with strikes.

In 2003 the state of São Paulo (where the promotion was based) prohibited the sanctioning of the Vale Tudo, and the event entered an hiatus period after 16 events.

Brief return and WKN partnership 
In January 2011, during an interview to channel Combate, Sergio Batarelli announced the return of the IVC in mid-2012 with a new ruleset based on the Unified Rules of Mixed Martial Arts, and acting as a feeder promotion to the UFC. IVC returned via kickboxing on Saturday, August 20, 2016, in Sorocaba, Sao Paulo, Brazil. The main event at IVC 15 is Felipe Micheletti Vs. Rogelio Ortiz for the World Kickboxing Network super cruiserweight world title. The event also included MMA and Kickboxing tournaments. After IVC 15 there were no more events and the organization is currently on hiatus.

Events 
The organization held 16 events, including 3 international events, starting with IVC 14 in Caracas, Venezuela, and two small events in 2002 and 2003 in the Federal Republic of Yugoslavia and Portugal respectively before begin banned by the government of the state of São Paulo.

Rules 
Sérgio Batarelli created the IVC as he perceived the new rules the UFC was adding were diluting what was a "real fight" and to keep the tradition of the original Vale Tudo going, as such, the IVC was a return to early rules-free Vale Tudo and UFC. Batarelli was the referee for all the matches. A common urban myth was that the IVC was totally rules-free and it only had a "honor code", but there were indeed official rules set by Batarelli, for example, the ban on putting hands or feet in the opponents trunks was made after the Goodridge match at IVC 1.

General rules 
 The maximum duration of each fight is 30 minutes with only one round
 Victory by Knockout, Technical Knockout, Submission or Decision.
 Any fouls will result in desqualification

Fouls 
 Biting
 Eye-gouging
 Fish-hooking
 Holding the ropes excessivelly
 Kicking if wearing wrestling shoes
 Put hands or feet inside the opponent's trunks (From IVC 2 onwards)

Championships

Heavyweight championship
Weight limit: Unlimited

Cruiserweight championship
Weight limit:

Middleweight Championship
Weight limit:

Lightweight championship
Weight limit:

Superfight championship
No weight restrictions

References

External links
 Official IVC website

Vale Tudo
Organizations established in 1997
Mixed martial arts organizations
Mixed martial arts in Brazil